Kheyrabad (also Romanized as Kheyrābād) is a village in Sarchehan Rural District, Sarchehan District, Bavanat County, Fars Province, Iran. At the 2006 census, its population was 122, in 33 families.

References 

Populated places in Sarchehan County